Hezar Khani (also Romanized as Hezār Khānī, Hazār Khāneh, and Hazār Khānī) is a village in Kusalan Rural District, in the Central District of Sarvabad County, Kurdistan Province, Iran. At the 2017 census, its population was 924 , in 250 families. The village is populated by Kurds.

References 

Towns and villages in Sarvabad County
Kurdish settlements in Kurdistan Province